Dušan Petrič (1916–1964) was a Slovene painter and graphic designer who won the Levstik Award in 1951 for his illustrations for Kaj je videl Mižek Figa (What Mižek Figa Saw). He also designed a number of political and other posters in the period immediately after the Second World War.

Selected Illustrated Works

 Pazi na glavo – glava ni žoga (Look After Your Head - Your Head Isn't a Ball), written by France Bevk, 1955
 Ujka (Tootle), written by Gertrude Crampton, 1954 
 Mižek Figa gre po svetu (Mižek Figa Goes Into the World), written by Janez Menart, 1953 
 Kaj je videl Mižek Figa (What Mižek Figa Saw), written by Ljudmila Prunk, 1951

References

Slovenian illustrators
Slovenian male painters
Levstik Award laureates
1916 births
1964 deaths
20th-century Slovenian painters
20th-century Slovenian male artists